The African Music Machine was a Shreveport funk band, led by Louis Villery, playing in the 1970s. It issued several singles which became collector's items. A compilation album Black Water Gold was issued in 2000. The band was re-formed by Villery in 2001, and issued an album on the Singular label.

They play mellow beats incorporating traditional African and Caribbean sounds.

References

African-American musical groups
American funk musical groups